Unfortunately may refer to:

Unfortunately, an album by Canadian rock band Shalabi Effect
Unfortunately (horse), a Thoroughbred racehorse